Passenger rail transport is one of the principal means of transport in the People's Republic of China, with rail passenger traffic exceeding 1.86 billion railway trips in 2011. It is operated by the China Railway Corporation (CR). The Spring Festival Travel Season is the peak railway travel season of the year.

Passenger train classes and route identifiers

Every train route has an identification number of two to five characters arranged by the Ministry of Railways. The first character can be alphabetic or numeric, while the second to fifth characters are all numeric.

Trains are classified as either up (even-numbered) trains or down (odd-numbered) trains. Since the capital Beijing is treated as the focal point of the rail network, trains from Beijing are down services (e.g. the T109 from Beijing to Shanghai), while trains towards Beijing are up services (e.g. the T110 from Shanghai to Beijing).

Trains that do not go either to or from Beijing are similarly designated up or down based on whether the railway they are traveling on would eventually lead them away from or towards Beijing. For example, the Z90 from Guangzhou to Shijiazhuang is an up service as it travels from Guangzhou in the direction of Beijing, but terminates in Shijiazhuang before reaching the capital.

Some longer routes change from being an up service to a down service, or vice versa, mid-route, with more than one reversal being possible on the same route. In this case, the train would have two designations. For example, the G1202 and G1205 both refer to the same train from Harbin to Shanghai. From Harbin as far as Tianjin West Railway Station, the service is the G1202 up service traveling in the "up-direction" of the Beijing–Harbin High-Speed Railway towards Beijing, but after Tianjin West the train begins traveling away from Beijing down the Beijing–Shanghai High-Speed Railway towards Shanghai, becoming the G1205 in the process. Note: this is not to be confused with the G1208/G1205 from Qingdao to Harbin, which also switches at Tianjin West.

The Z31/Z34 from Wuchang to Ningbo is a more complicated example. It starts as the Z31 down service from Wuchang to Zhuji, traveling away from Beijing. At Zhuji, it becomes the Z34 up service towards Beijing. However, one stop later at Shaoxing, it reverts to being the Z31.

Types
The preceding letter of route identifier indicates the type of the passenger train, often determined by the speed and the stop patterns.

Types by 2004:

Types during 2004 – 2009:

As the Rule of The Edit and Management of Train Timetable, a rule issued by Ministry of Railway, the arrangement of following passenger train classes was put into practice from April 1, 2009.

Types during 2009 – 2015:

Types since 2015:

CRH trains

G ("Gaosu Dongche", 高速动车; High Speed EMU Train)

G trains is a series for long-distance high-speed trains. These are generally the fastest services available and the top speed can be up to  but travel around  operationally. As such they generally serve only lines capable of such speeds. G1–G5998 is used for the trains that run in more than one railway bureau's territory, while G6001–G9998 is used for the trains that run in only one railway bureau's territory. G trains never run overnight and thus have no sleeper car.

D ("Dongche", 动车; EMU Train)
This series has become available after the sixth rise in speed of the railway on April 18, 2007. The top speed will be up to 250–200 km/h but are limited to 250 km/h operationally. These trains are powered using CRH series electric multiple units (EMUs) named "Harmony" (Chinese:和谐号, Hexiehao). D1–D3998 for the trains running through two or more railway bureaus, D4001–D9998 for the trains running within one railway bureau. "D" services can run on high-speed lines, upgraded conventional lines or even over conventional railways at conventional speeds for a portion of their journey to connect some cities off the high-speed network.

D-series trains provide relatively fast frequent service between main cities in China. For example:
 Beijing–Shijiazhuang (2 hours travel time), Taiyuan(3 hours travel time), Handan (3–3.5 hours travel time), Zhengzhou(5 hours travel time).
 Xiamen–Shenzhen(3.5 hour travel time)
 Shanghai–Nanjing (2 hours travel time), Hangzhou(1.5 hours travel time), some continuing to destinations beyond such as Zhengzhou and Hankou.
Besides, a few other nighttime D trains go to more remote destinations, such as the services between Shanghai and Beijing.

C ("Chengji Dongche", 城际动车; Intercity EMU Train)

This series has become available after August 1, 2008 with the opening of Beijing–Tianjin Intercity Rail. It represents the EMU trains within a metropolitan region, and mainly running within one railway bureau. The top speed is 350 km/h (e.g. Beijing-Tianjin) but most operate from 200 to 160 km/h. C1–C1998 for the trains running through two or more railway bureaus, C2001–C9998 for the trains running within one railway bureau. Some of these services run more as commuter trains to/from satellite cities surrounding major urban centres or from downtown to the airport, as at Lanzhou.

Conventional rail
Z ("Zhida", 直达; Non-Stop Express)
'Z' trains, though their name in Chinese technically implies a "non-stop" overnight train, some of these trains have several stops between the two stations. The majority have both soft sleepers and hard sleepers, while some Z trains have only soft sleepers. The top speed is 160 km/h. It uses the numbers Z1-Z9998 without regard to the number of railway bureaus entered.

This series became available after the fifth rise in speed of the railway on April 18, 2004.
Early on (2004–2006), all but one of the Z-series trains had either Beijing or Beijing West station as their destination or origin. As of 2009, Z-series trains also operated along the Yangtze Valley as well, providing overnight service from Wuhan to Shanghai, Hangzhou, Ningbo and Shenzhen.

T ("Tekuai", 特快; Express)
This series of trains have a limited number of stops along their routes, only in major cities, or in some instances stops for switching the driver or locomotive. The top speed is 140 km/h. T1–T4998 for the trains running through two or more railway bureaus, T5001–T9998 for the trains running within one railway bureau. The standard pronunciation on the railway system is "Te"() in Chinese.

K ("Kuaisu", 快速; Fast)
This series of trains stop at more stations than T-series. The top speed is 120 km/h. The standard pronunciation on the railway system is "Kuai"() in Chinese. K1–K6998 are used for the trains that run in more than one railway bureau, while K7001 to K9998 will be used for the trains that run in only one railway bureau.

After April 18, 2004, N-series trains, which represent fast trains travelling exclusively within one railway bureau, were derived from K-series. Then all K-series trains travel on lines operated by more than one railway bureau. After April 1, 2009, N-series was re-merged to K-series after April 1, 2009.

General Fast Train
General fast trains (which can be shortened to) are slower passenger trains that stop at around half of the stations along the way, resulting in a longer travel time than the fast trains. The top speed is 120 km/h. Route numbers are always four numeric digits—a numeric prefix from 1-5 followed by a 3-digit route number. Numbers 1001–1998 for the trains running through three or more railway bureaus, 2001–3998 for the trains running through two railway bureaus, and 4001–5998 for the trains that run in only one railway bureau.

General Train
The general train (which can be shortened to) has as many stops as possible, and is often the preferred choice for rural workers to visit their home villages because of low ticket price. This is the slowest type of train and has the lowest priority in the Fixed Train Timetable. The top speed is 100 km/h. These trains are often the only available transportation in rural area lacking highway infrastructures, but is gradually being phased out in favour of faster trains.

Route identifiers for general trains are always 4 digits—a numeric prefix from 6-7 followed by a 3-digit route number. 6001–6198 are used for the trains that run in more than one railway bureau, while 7001–7598 will be used for the trains that run in only one railway bureau.

Commuter Train

The commuter train is usually runs for railway staff to commute or consult their doctor, but also takes their children to school and brings them back in some areas. Generally tickets for such a kind of train are not available for passengers. Route identifiers for commuter trains are 4 digits with a range of 7601–8998.

Temporary Train
The "L" trains are temporary — they are not listed in the official train schedule, but are added when necessary. Many of these trains only operate at peak passenger travel season such as during the spring festival travel season. In addition, many new train services are originally added as L-series before train schedules are readjusted and later become regular services. L1–L6998 are used for the temporary trains that run in more than one railway bureau, while L7001–L9998 will be used for the trains that run in only one railway bureau. Recently the type was merged into other types for more kinds of temporary services (e.g. Temporary Limited Express).

Y ("Linshilüyou", 临时旅游; Temporary Tourist Train)
This series is used for trains that specifically run for tourism. Only very few trains begin with Y. Besides, travel agencies can apply to the Railways Department for organizing additional passenger trains for the tours.

S ("Shijiao", 市郊; Suburban Commuter Rail)
This is a newer class developed to utilize idle tracks (mostly industrial or former industrial) to provide commuter travel to larger city centers from its suburban areas. Existing service until 2015 are S2 line from Yanqing County to Beijing, and Tianjin–Jixian Railway from Ji County to Tianjin. The Jinshan Railway from Jinshan County to Shanghai also fell in this category, but it is fully embedded in Shanghai Metro lines therefore tickets are not available on CR's website; while the other two offers more conventional service.

Accommodation and fares

High-speed rail
 Business Class Seat, on a few services pending on train type, such as the CRH380AL or CRH380BL trains. 3 seats per row (2+1). Lie-flat seats with airline style catering provided.
 Premier Class Seat, can vary, pending on train type, from being similar to Business Class style seats or First Class seats located in premier or sightseeing positions such as behind the drivers cab. 3 seats per row (2+1) or compartment seats. Unlike Business Class seats, these seats are not lie-flat seats, but can in general recline.
 First Class Seat, used for CRH series EMU trains. There are 4 seats per row (2+2), just similar as soft seat.
 Second Class Seat, used for CRH series EMU trains. Similar as hard seat, there are 5 seats per row (3+2), the sitting area is relatively small.
 Sleeper Berth, used for CRH series EMU trains. Found on only a few 'D' trains running overnight between Shanghai-Beijing or Beijing-Shenzhen. Similar as a soft sleeper on conventional trains but are limited to 4 berths to a compartment. Some upper berths can fold away to permit running purely as seated passengers.

Conventional rail
 Hard seat is the basic fare, somewhat similar to the economy class on an airplane. On busier routes, passengers who cannot arrange for better seats because of overcrowding must also purchase this type of ticket. In some cases, tickets are sold with no seat assigned (无座, wú zuò), which allows the railway to sell more tickets than there are seats in the car. Still, even the number of "no seat" tickets offered for sale is limited, to keep overcrowding within limits.
 Soft seat is one level above the Hard Seat. There are 4 seats per row (2+2), so it has comfortable seating similar to business class on airplanes.
 Hard sleeper is the basic accommodation for an overnight train. Despite the name, the bunks comfortably accommodate anyone below six feet. Bunks are arranged three on a side in a compartment—indicated by top, middle and bottom on the ticket. There are no doors for the compartments.
 Soft sleeper contains a wider bunk bed in an enclosed cabin, two bunks to a side. There is more room for luggage storage than in hard sleeper. Occasionally there may be an entertainment system where movie channels are available for viewing through headphones and an LCD display for each bunk.
 Luxury sleeper ( or ) is the top level sleeper that is only provided by a few trains. The ticket is also much more expensive than that of soft sleeper. It only contains two beds in a cabin, and there is an independent toilet in every cabin. Some of them have a shower cubicle in the car.

Common to high-speed and conventional trains are Standing tickets, these do not entitle the person to a seat and they must stand for the journey. During peak travel seasons, can lead to extreme overcrowding. Ticket holders are assigned to a carriage, on conventional trains it is usually hard seat carriages only, and not permitted in soft seat or sleeper carriages. On High-Speed trains, fewer standing tickets are available and limited to entry vestibules and cafe cars. At stations or from on-board vendors, small folding seats are often sold to allow these passengers to sit in the aisles.

The fares are different between trains with or without air-conditioning.

The majority of train tickets in China are thermally printed paper tickets displaying the train's origin and destination, service number, price, date and travel time, accommodation type, class and seat number, as well as a barcode for security checks. Some tickets on the CRH routes such as Nanjing–Shanghai–Hangzhou or Guangzhou–Shenzhen use machine-readable tickets i.e. tickets on the Nanjing–Shanghai route have a magnetically encoded stripe for future use of automatic ticket inspection gates being implemented at major stations along the route, whilst tickets on the Guangzhou–Shenzhen line have embedded RFID microchips which can be read by proximity readers mounted above the ticket gates.

Most trains feature some kind of on-board catering service. Vendors with trolleys walk through the train selling snacks, drinks, fruit, newspapers etc. On shorter distance trains and many high-speed trains, there is a cafe-car selling light snacks, tea, coffee, beer etc. whilst conventional long-haul trains have full-service restaurant cars. At many stations along the route, vendors will sell fruit, prepared food and instant noodles on the platforms during the stops for conventional trains. Hot-water is provided in almost every carriage for passengers to make tea or instant noodles.

Smoking is generally not permitted in the accommodation or washroom areas of the trains but is allowed in the restaurant/cafe area and in the vestibules between the cars. On modern trains such as CRH or Beijing Suburban railway smoking is completely banned, with some smoke detectors connected to the brakes to stop the train, causing errant smokers facing hefty fines and penalties. On the Guangzhou–Kowloon cross-border train smoking is only permitted in the cafe car.

E-tickets and Internet ticket purchase

Since July 12, 2011, the e-ticket system has been firstly adopted on Beijing–Tianjin Intercity Railway. Since December 23, 2011, all tickets can be bought at the official ticket website (12306.cn) except for trains due to depart in less than two hours.

Debit card and credit cards with the China UnionPay icon, Alipay, and WeChat Pay are accepted.

Identification of one of the following types is required:
 ID card of PRC (1st or 2nd generation)
 Home Return Permit Hong Kong & Macau Resident to Mainland Permit or Mainland Resident to Hong Kong & Macau Permit
 Taiwan Resident to Mainland Permit or Mainland Resident to Taiwan Permit
 Valid Passport

Check-in

ID Card

Applicable only to holders of a second-generation ID card: In lieu of the traditional paper ticket, passengers may swipe their cards to pass through automatic entry and exit gates at stations on the following routes:
 Beijing–Tianjin Intercity Railway
 Beijing–Shanghai High-Speed Railway (Except the CRH Bed train that runs through old Beijing–Shanghai Railway)
 Shanghai–Nanjing Intercity Railway
 Shanghai–Hangzhou Passenger Railway
 Wuhan–Guangzhou High-Speed Railway (Except the CRH train which does not run on this line but stops at Wuhan station)
 Guangzhou–Shenzhen–Hong Kong Express Rail Link
 Guangzhou–Shenzhen Railway (Except Guangzhou station)
 Guangzhou–Zhuhai Intercity Railway
 Hainan Eastern Ring High-Speed Railway (Except Haikou station)
 Fenghua station to Xiamen North station of Hangzhou–Fuzhou–Shenzhen High-Speed Railway plus Xiamen railway station and Fuzhou railway station
Harbin-Dalian High-speed Railway

Passengers checking in with their ID card may request a paper ticket within 31 days of completing their journey.

Paper ticket
Passengers without a second-generation ID card must collect paper tickets at the ticket windows of rail stations, or authorized ticket-selling agents (火车票代售点) whose shops can be found in cities throughout China. The e-ticket number as well as proper identification of all passengers are required.

Tickets are checked at both departure and arrival stations.

Changes and refunds
Changes to online bookings can be made up to 2 hours before departure.

If within 2 hours of departure or already in possession of a paper ticket, passengers must make changes at the rail station.

Cross-border trains

to Hong Kong (Kowloon) 

Through trains are available between Kowloon (Hung Hom station) and Beijing West, Shanghai, Guangzhou East,  Passengers have to pass departure immigration at departure station and arrival immigration at arrival station, and boarding and alighting at intermediate stations are not allowed for cross-border passengers.

For Beijing/Shanghai to Kowloon routes, additional carriages are attached in the section between Beijing/Shanghai and Guangzhou East for domestic passengers, where boarding and alighting is allowed at intermediate stations. Tickets cannot be booked through the CR website.

to Hong Kong (West Kowloon via Guangshen'gang HXL) 

Through High-speed services are available since 2018 between West Kowloon and Shenzhen, Guangzhou and other cities in mainland China like Shanghai, Xiamen, Guiyang and Beijing. Passengers have to past immigrations in West Kowloon station, and those trains also serve as normal high-speed trains in mainland China. Sections operated by CR (from other stations in mainland China to Shenzhen Futian) and MTR (West Kowloon to Shenzhen Futian) have different pricing policies, making the cross-border section one of the most expensive in China. Tickets can be booked through Internet.

International passenger trains 
A few K and Z trains can transport passengers out of China to places such as Ulaanbaatar in Mongolia, Moscow in Russia, Almaty in Kazakhstan, P'yŏngyang in North Korea, Hanoi in Vietnam and so on. Tickets can only be bought through travel agents near the departure station.

See also

 Coach yard
 List of tram and light rail transit systems
 List of town tramway systems in Asia
 List of rapid transit systems
 List of trolleybus systems
Urban rail transit in China

References

External links

 
 Official Ticket Website (Serving Time: 6:00-23:00 Beijing Time)
 Individual passenger route maps of China Rail viewed in Open Maps with timetable (Chinese and English information)
Passenger train information online
 Checking Train Schedules Online